James L. Brooks is an American filmmaker. He is known for his work as a writer-director-producer.

Brooks is mostly known for his film work often directing films such as Terms of Endearment (1983), Broadcast News (1987), and As Good as it Gets (1997). He has received eight Academy Award nominations winning three for Best Picture, Best Director, and Best Original Screenplay for Terms of Endearment. He also received six Golden Globe Award nominations winning for Best Screenplay for Terms of Endearment. He also received a Directors Guild of America Award, a Producers Guild of America Award, and a Writers Guild of America Award. 

He is also known for his work on television including The Mary Tyler Moore Show, Taxi and The Simpsons. He has received 54 Primetime Emmy Award nominations winning 20 awards in various categories.

Major associations

Academy Awards

Golden Globe Award

Primetime Emmy Awards

Guild awards

Directors Guild of America Awards

Producers Guild of America Awards

Writers Guild of America Awards

Miscellaneous awards

References 

Lists of awards received by writer
Lists of awards received by film director